Diademodontidae is an extinct family of Triassic gomphodonts. The best-known genus is Diademodon from South Africa. Titanogomphodon from Namibia may also be a member of Diademodontidae. The Chinese genera Hazhenia and Ordosiodon have also been included in the family, but were more recently identified as baurioid therocephalians. Remains of a diademodontid were reported in the  Early-Middle Triassic Fremouw Formation in Antarctica, but that specimen was later referred to the trirachodontid Impidens

References

Cynognathians
Early Triassic first appearances
Late Triassic extinctions
Prehistoric therapsid families